An atoll is a ring-shaped island, including a coral rim that encircles a lagoon partially or completely. There may be coral islands or cays on the rim.  Atolls are located in warm tropical or subtropical parts of the oceans and seas where corals can grow. Most of the approximately 440 atolls in the world are in the Pacific Ocean.

Two different, well-cited models, the subsidence and antecedent karst models, have been used to explain the development of atolls. According to Charles Darwin's subsidence model, the formation of an atoll is explained by the sinking of a volcanic island around which a coral fringing reef has formed. Over geologic time, the volcanic island becomes extinct and eroded as it subsides completely beneath the surface of the ocean. As the volcanic island subsides, the coral fringing reef becomes a barrier reef that is detached from the island. Eventually, reef and the small coral islets on top of it are all that is left of the original island, and a lagoon has taken the place of the former volcano. The lagoon is not the former volcanic crater. For the atoll to persist, the coral reef must be maintained at the sea surface, with coral growth matching any relative change in sea level (sinking of the island or rising oceans).

An alternative model for the origin of atolls, called the antecedent karst model, was first proposed by J. E. Hoffmeister, later revised by E. G. Prudy, and evaluated and modified using a compilation of seismic reflection and drillhole data from various atolls by A. W. Droxler and others. In the antecedent karst model, the first step in the formation of an atoll is the development of a flat top, mound-like coral reef during the subsidence of an oceanic island of either volcanic or nonvolcanic origin below sea level. Then, when relative sea level drops below the level of the flat surface of coral reef, it is exposed to the atmosphere as a flat topped island which is dissolved by rainfall to form limestone karst. Because of hydrologic properties of this karst, the rate of dissolution of the exposed coral is lowest along its rim and the rate of dissolution increases inward to its maximum at the center of the island. As a result, a saucer shaped island with a raised rim forms. When relative sea level submerges the island again, the rim provides a rocky core on which coral grow again to form the islands of an atoll and the flooded bottom of the saucer forms the lagoon within them.

Usage 
The word atoll comes from the Dhivehi word atholhu (Dhivehi:), Dhivehi is an Indo-Aryan language spoken in Maldives. The word's first recorded English use was in 1625 as atollon. Charles Darwin coined the term in his monograph, The Structure and Distribution of Coral Reefs. He recognized the word's indigenous origin and defined it as a "circular group of coral islets", synonymously with "lagoon-island".

More modern definitions of atoll describe them as "annular reefs enclosing a lagoon in which there are no promontories other than reefs and islets composed of reef detritus" or "in an exclusively morphological sense, [as] a ring-shaped ribbon reef enclosing a lagoon".

Distribution and size 

There are approximately 440 atolls in the world.

Most of the world's atolls are in the Pacific Ocean (with concentrations in the Caroline Islands, the Coral Sea Islands, the Marshall Islands, the Tuamotu Islands, Kiribati, Tokelau, and Tuvalu) and the Indian Ocean (the Chagos Archipelago, Lakshadweep, the atolls of the Maldives, and the Outer Islands of Seychelles). The Atlantic Ocean has no large groups of atolls, other than eight atolls east of Nicaragua that belong to the Colombian department of San Andres and Providencia in the Caribbean.

Reef-building corals will thrive only in warm tropical and subtropical waters of oceans and seas, and therefore atolls are found only in the tropics and subtropics. The northernmost atoll in the world is Kure Atoll at 28°25′ N, along with other atolls of the Northwestern Hawaiian Islands. The southernmost atolls in the world are Elizabeth Reef at 29°57′ S, and nearby Middleton Reef at 29°27′ S, in the Tasman Sea, both of which are part of the Coral Sea Islands Territory. The next southerly atoll is Ducie Island in the Pitcairn Islands Group, at 24°41′ S. 
The atoll closest to the Equator is Aranuka of Kiribati. Its southern tip is just 13 km (8 mi) north of the Equator.

Bermuda is sometimes claimed as the "northernmost atoll" at a latitude of 32°18′ N. At this latitude, coral reefs would not develop without the warming waters of the Gulf Stream. However, Bermuda is termed a pseudo-atoll because its general form, while resembling that of an atoll, has a very different origin of formation.

In most cases, the land area of an atoll is very small in comparison to the total area. Measured by total area, Lifou is the largest raised coral atoll of the world, followed by Rennell Island. More sources, however, list Kiritimati as the largest atoll in the world in terms of land area. It is also a raised coral atoll ( land area; according to other sources even ),  main lagoon,  other lagoons (according to other sources  total lagoon size).

The remains of an ancient atoll as a hill in a limestone area is called a reef knoll. The largest atoll in terms of island numbers is Huvadhu Atoll in the south of the Maldives, with 255 islands.

Formation 

In 1842, Charles Darwin explained the creation of coral atolls in the southern Pacific Ocean based upon observations made during a five-year voyage aboard HMS Beagle from 1831 to 1836. Darwin's explanation suggests that several tropical island types: from high volcanic island, through barrier reef island, to atoll, represented a sequence of gradual subsidence of what started as an oceanic volcano. He reasoned that a fringing coral reef surrounding a volcanic island in the tropical sea will grow upward as the island subsides (sinks), becoming an "almost atoll", or barrier reef island, as typified by an island such as Aitutaki in the Cook Islands, and Bora Bora and others in the Society Islands. The fringing reef becomes a barrier reef for the reason that the outer part of the reef maintains itself near sea level through biotic growth, while the inner part of the reef falls behind, becoming a lagoon because conditions are less favorable for the coral and calcareous algae responsible for most reef growth. In time, subsidence carries the old volcano below the ocean surface and the barrier reef remains. At this point, the island has become an atoll.

As formulated by J. E. Hoffmeister, F. S. McNeil, E. G. Prudy, and others, the antecedent karst model argues that atolls are Pleistocene features that are the direct result of the interaction between subsidence and preferential karst dissolution that occurred in the interior of flat topped coral reefs during exposure during glacial lowstands of sea level. The elevated rims along an island created by this preferential karst dissolution become the sites of coral growth and islands of atolls when flooded during interglacial highstands.

The research of A. W. Droxler and others supports the antecedent karst model as they found that the morphology of modern atolls are independent of any influence of an underlying submerged and buried island and are not rooted to an initial fringing reef /barrier reef attached to a slowly subsiding volcanic edifice. In fact, the Neogene reefs underlying the studied modern atolls overlie and completely bury the subsided island are all non-atoll, flat-topped reefs. In fact, they found that atolls did not form doing the subsidence of an island until MIS-11, Mid-Brunhes, long after the many the former islands had been completely submerged and buried by flat topped reefs during the Neogene.

Atolls are the product of the growth of tropical marine organisms, and so these islands are found only in warm tropical waters. Volcanic islands located beyond the warm water temperature requirements of hermatypic (reef-building) organisms become seamounts as they subside, and are eroded away at the surface. An island that is located where the ocean water temperatures are just sufficiently warm for upward reef growth to keep pace with the rate of subsidence is said to be at the Darwin Point. Islands in colder, more polar regions evolve toward seamounts or guyots; warmer, more equatorial islands evolve toward atolls, for example Kure Atoll. However, ancient atolls during the Mesozoic appear to exhibit different growth and evolution patterns. 

Coral atolls are important as sites where dolomitization of calcite occurs. Several models have been proposed for the dolomitization of calcite and aragonite within them. They are the evaporative, seepage-reflux, mixing-zone, burial, and seawater models. Although the origin of replacement dolomites remains problematic and controversial, it is generally accepted that seawater was the source of magnesium for dolomitization and the fluid in which calcite was dolomitized to form the dolomites found within atolls. Various processes have been invoked to drive large amounts of seawater through an atoll in order for dolomitization to occur.

Investigation by the Royal Society of London

In 1896, 1897 and 1898, the Royal Society of London carried out drilling on Funafuti atoll in Tuvalu for the purpose of investigating the formation of coral reefs. They wanted to determine whether traces of shallow water organisms could be found at depth in the coral of Pacific atolls. This investigation followed the work on the structure and distribution of coral reefs conducted by Charles Darwin in the Pacific.

The first expedition in 1896 was led by Professor William Johnson Sollas of the University of Oxford. Geologists included Walter George Woolnough and Edgeworth David of the University of Sydney. Professor Edgeworth David led the expedition in 1897. The third expedition in 1898 was led by Alfred Edmund Finckh.

United States national monuments 

On January 6, 2009, U.S. President George W. Bush announced the creation of the Pacific Remote Islands Marine National Monument, covering several islands and atolls under U.S. jurisdiction.

See also 

 Baratal limestone, sometimes described as the oldest known atoll
 Low island
 Nukuoro Atoll
 Kapingamarangi Atoll

References 

 Dobbs, David. 2005. Reef Madness: Charles Darwin, Alexander Agassiz, and the Meaning of Coral.  Pantheon. 
 Fairbridge, R. W. 1950. "Recent and Pleistocene coral reefs of Australia". J. Geol., 58(4): 330–401.
 McNeil, F. S. 1954. "Organic reefs and banks and associated detrital sediments". Amer. J. Sci., 252(7): 385–401.

External links 

 Formation of Bermuda reefs
 Darwin's Volcano – a short video discussing Darwin and Agassiz' coral reef formation debate
 NOAA National Ocean Service Education - Coral Atoll Animation
 NOAA National Ocean Service - What are the three main types of coral reefs?
 Research Article: Predicting Coral Recruitment in Palau’s Complex Reef Archipelago
 World Atolls, Goldberg 2016: A global map containing all atolls

 
Coastal and oceanic landforms
Oceanographical terminology
Biogeomorphology
Islands by type